Kotalah Kamar (also Romanized as Katalah Kamar) is a village in Nazarkahrizi Rural District, Nazarkahrizi District, Hashtrud County, East Azerbaijan Province, Iran. At the 2006 census, its population was 106, in 22 families.

References 

Towns and villages in Hashtrud County